Tokyo Highway Battle is a video game developed by Genki and published by Jaleco in 1996 for the PlayStation and Sega Saturn. It was released in Japan as Shutokou Battle: Drift King for the Playstation, and Drift King: Shutokou Battle '97 for the Sega Saturn. The game is part of the Shutokou Battle franchise.

Gameplay
Tokyo Highway Battle is a game in which players race around three tracks on the highways of Tokyo.

Reception
Next Generation reviewed the PlayStation version of the game, rating it three stars out of five, and stated that "Tokyo Highway Battle doesn't rank up there with the best of them, but it isn't far behind."

Reviews
GameFan #45 (Vol 4, Issue 9) 1996 September
VideoGames & Computer Entertainment (May, 1996)
IGN - Nov 26, 1996
NowGamer - Jun 01, 1997
GameSpot - Feb 13, 1997

References

1996 video games
Blue Planet Software games
Imagineer games
Jaleco games
PlayStation (console) games
Racing video games
Sega Saturn games
THQ games
Tokyo Xtreme Racer
Video games developed in Japan
Video games set in Tokyo